Yornup is a small town in the South West region of Western Australia, situated between Bridgetown and Manjimup on the South Western Highway.

Yornup's name is of Noongar origin. It was primarily a milling settlement, and Greenacres Mill continues to this day. A timber company, Lewis and Reid, built a mill in town that was sold in 1923 to Bunning Brothers who upgraded the mill in 1935 and continued to operate until 1951 when the Donnelly River mill commenced operations.

A railway line between the Donnelly Mill and Yornup was built in 1948 and remained in use until the last steam train was retired in 1970.

At one point, Yornup had a school, post office, hall and stores; only the hall remains today, used for community dances. The school was relocated to the rear of 144 Hampton Street, Bridgetown, in March 1996 in anticipation of the construction of a heritage precinct which never eventuated. A large Western Power substation is located in the town, and an industrial estate is proposed for the area.

References

External links
 Tales from times past, ABC South West, 5 July 2004

Towns in Western Australia
South West (Western Australia)
Timber towns in Western Australia